Blue Steel is a 1990 American action thriller film directed by Kathryn Bigelow and starring Jamie Lee Curtis, Ron Silver, and Clancy Brown. The film is about a police officer who shoots and kills a robbery suspect on her first day of duty and then becomes involved with a witness of the shooting.

The film was initially set to be released by Vestron Pictures and its offshoot label Lightning Pictures, but it was ultimately released by Metro-Goldwyn-Mayer which acquired the film due to Vestron's financial problems and eventual bankruptcy.

Lawrence Kasanoff, Vestron's head of production at the time, green lit and produced the movie.

Plot 

NYPD cadet Megan Turner is shown to kill one suspect before succumbing to another in a training exercise. Following graduation from the police academy, on her first day of duty she shoots and kills a robber with her service revolver at a supermarket. The robber’s Smith & Wesson Model 29 revolver falls to the ground and lands directly in front of commodities trader Eugene Hunt, one of the customers lying on the floor. Unnoticed, Hunt takes the gun and slips away. Because the robber's weapon was not found at the scene and the other witnesses are unclear about seeing a handgun, Turner is accused of killing an unarmed man.

While she attempts to clear her name with Assistant Chief Stanley Hoyt and her superiors, the suspended Turner begins dating Hunt, who has become obsessed with her. Unbeknown to Turner, Hunt has taken the gun and started committing random killings. At the first killing he leaves behind a spent shell on which he has carved Megan Turner’s name.  Shortly thereafter, Hunt begins hearing voices telling him he is unique and to kill again.  One night, at his apartment he displays an unusual interest in Megan’s gun and her shooting stance. He reveals that he was in the supermarket at the time of the robbery, and that he left with the perpetrator's gun and that he is the person behind the recent killings. Turner arrests him but he is freed by his attorney, Mel Dawson, due to a lack of concrete evidence.

Turner fights to keep her badge and solve the murders with the help of Detective Nick Mann. Hunt arrives at her apartment, assaults her and shoots her best friend, Tracy, before rendering her unconscious with a blow to the head with the gun and then burying the gun in a park. Turner regains consciousness and goes to Hunt's apartment with Mann to arrest him, but Dawson prevents her from doing so and threatens to once more have her fired.

Seeking comfort from her mother, Turner visits her family home, an uncomfortable place because her father physically abused her mother throughout her childhood. When she arrives, she finds that her mother is bruised. Enraged, Turner handcuffs her father and arrests him. During the drive they stop and talk in an attempt to finally put an end to his abuse. When they return to the house, Hunt is posing as a guest sitting with her mother. A tense exchange takes place between the two, where they both imply that they are armed. When he leaves, she goes to his apartment, where she spends the night staking him out.

The next morning, Turner follows Hunt to the park, where he has buried his gun. Mann interrupts another standoff between Hunt and Turner, where Megan is attempting to get Hunt to try for her gun and Hunt runs off. Believing that he will return for the murder weapon, they stake out the park. Turner sees the beam of a flashlight and assumes it is Hunt searching for the gun. She leaves the car to apprehend him, but not before handcuffing Mann to the steering wheel to prevent him from following her. The flashlight turns out to be a ruse: Hunt paid a homeless woman to decoy the police. Back at the car, Hunt is outside the car holding Mann at gunpoint and is about to kill him. Turner appears and fires her gun, shooting Hunt in the left arm before he escapes in traffic.

Mann and Turner return to her apartment, where unbeknownst to them, Hunt is patching up his wound in her bathroom. The pair have sex and Mann is ambushed by Hunt and shot when he goes to the bathroom. Turner does not hear the shot because it was muffled by a towel. Hunt attacks and rapes Megan and she eventually kicks him away and gets her hands on her gun and shoots at him, but he flees. Mann is unconscious and taken to the hospital, where Turner is told that he will make it.

Determined to find Hunt and finish him off, Turner knocks out her police guard, then takes his uniform and gun. She wanders the streets and Hunt follows her into the subway. Turner and Hunt are both shot and the gun fight carries on out to the street. She finally shoots and kills him after a long and violent confrontation in the middle of Wall Street after running him down with an abandoned car and him running out of bullets. Other police officers arrive and she is taken away in an ambulance to the hospital.

Cast 
 Jamie Lee Curtis as Officer Megan Turner
 Ron Silver as Eugene Hunt
 Clancy Brown as Detective Nick Mann
 Elizabeth Peña as Tracy Perez
 Louise Fletcher as Shirley Turner
 Philip Bosco as Frank Turner
 Richard Jenkins as Dawson
 Kevin Dunn as Assistant Chief Stanley Hoyt
 Tom Sizemore as Robber
 Mary Mara as Wife
 Skipp Lynch as Instructor
 Mike Hodge as Police Commissioner
 Mike Starr as Superintendent
 Tom Sizemore as Wool Cap
 Lauren Tom as Female Reporter

Reception

Box office 
Blue Steel premiered at the Sundance Film Festival in Park City, Utah in January 1990. The film was not a box office success.

Critical response
On Rotten Tomatoes the film has an approval rating of 75% based on reviews from 28 critics. The consenus states: "Blue Steels increasingly over-the-top story beggars disbelief, but this cop drama is elevated by an appealing cast and Kathryn Bigelow's stylish direction." On Metacritic the film has a score of 54% based on reviews from 20 critics. Audiences polled by CinemaScore gave the film an average grade of "B−" on an A+ to F scale.

Film critic Roger Ebert compared it to John Carpenter's Halloween, noting: "Blue Steel is a sophisticated update of Halloween, the movie that first made Jamie Lee Curtis a star. (...) What makes it more interesting than yet another sequel to Halloween is the way the filmmakers have fleshed out the formula with intriguing characters and a few angry ideas."

References

External links 
 
 
 

1990 films
1990s English-language films
1990 action thriller films
1990 crime thriller films
American action thriller films
American crime thriller films
Films directed by Kathryn Bigelow
Films set in New York City
Films shot in New York City
American police detective films
American serial killer films
Vestron Pictures films
Metro-Goldwyn-Mayer films
Films scored by Brad Fiedel
Fictional portrayals of the New York City Police Department
Films about the New York City Police Department
1990s serial killer films
1990s American films